Wu Yen-hsia or Wu Yanxia (1930–2001) was a Chinese t'ai chi ch'uan teacher of Manchu ancestry.

Biography 
She was the daughter of Wu Kung-i (1900-1970) from whom she learned t'ai chi. She also helped in the teaching of her father's students. Wu Yen-hsia was the younger sister of Wu Ta-k'uei and Wu Ta-ch'i, and married Kuo Hsiao-chung, who was also a disciple of her father. She held the position of senior instructor of the Wu family from 1996 to her death in 2001 and was succeeded by her cousin Wu Ta-hsin.

Wu Yen-hsia moved to Hong Kong from Shanghai in 1948. In an interview late in her life, she mentioned that she had often seconded her older brother Wu Ta-k'uei at his many challenge fights in those years. She mentioned applying first aid to any injuries resulting from the fights, and she was "fearful that someone would be killed and there would be big trouble for the family" because her brother was "young and overly fierce".

She attended to the affairs of the Chien-ch'uan Tai Chi Chuan Association while training her students and disciples. She became known as a specialist with the t'ai chi sword and t'ai chi spear.

See also 
 Wu-style form list
 Wu-style t'ai chi ch'uan

References

External links 
 
 International Wu Style Tai Chi Chuan Federation website

1930 births
2001 deaths
Chinese tai chi practitioners
Manchu martial artists